Latoia albifrons is a species of moth in the family Limacodidae. It is found in Malawi and Madagascar.

References

External links
boldsystems.org: Pictures of Lataia albifrons

Limacodidae
Moths described in 1844
Moths of Madagascar
Lepidoptera of Malawi
Moths of Sub-Saharan Africa
Taxa named by Félix Édouard Guérin-Méneville